Get the Message may refer to:

 Get the Message (game show), a 1964 American TV game show
 "Get the Message" (song), a song by Electronic
 Get the Message – The Best of Electronic, an album
 Get the Message, an episode of The Loud House
 Get the Message (film), a 1972 Disney educational animated short
 Get the Message, a 1987 play by Clive King